Brzezowa may refer to the following places:
Brzezowa, Bochnia County in Lesser Poland Voivodeship (south Poland)
Brzezowa, Myślenice County in Lesser Poland Voivodeship (south Poland)
Brzezowa, Subcarpathian Voivodeship (south-east Poland)